Tanjong Katong Secondary School (TKSS) is a co-educational government autonomous school in Singapore. Before its autonomous status, the school was frequently named by the Ministry of Education (MOE) as the 'Best Non-Independent and Non-Autonomous Secondary School' in its annual ranking of secondary schools, which has since been abolished. TKSS was awarded the School Excellence Award in 2007, the highest tier in the masterplan of awards given by MOE to schools in Singapore.

History

The school was first opened in 1956 as Tanjong Katong Secondary Technical School, accepting boys only. In 1969, the school began to take in female students, and in 1970, new centralised workshops, science laboratories and classrooms were constructed. By 1979, the number of students had risen to 5,000.

The school was renamed Tanjong Katong Secondary School in 1993, and in 1996 the school acquired the premises of the neighbouring Tanjong Katong Girls' School. Two years later, the school moved to its new premises at 130 Haig Road, which is about 550 metres away from its old location.

The following year, TKSS was one of the pioneering schools to be awarded the Sustained Achievement Award when the award was first introduced.  The opening ceremony of the new campus was held in 2000. The school became one of the Top 20 Value-Added schools in 2001. In 2003, it was presented with the Sustained Achievement Award for Value-Added. In 2004, the school achieved a 98% distinction rate for Chemistry in the Singapore-Cambridge GCE Ordinary Level examinations.

In 2004, the school was accorded Autonomous status. Following the new status came the School Distinction Award; the school was one of the pioneer 12 schools to be given the award. Another addition that year was the presentation of Singapore Quality Class status in recognition of the efficient organisation of the school. The academic curriculum in the school was recognised when it received the Best Practice Award for Teaching and Learning. Other areas were recognised with the achievements of Sustained Achievement Awards for Physical Fitness, Uniformed Groups and Value-Added. As a result, TKSS is prominently known throughout Singapore for its excellent curriculum.

TKSS was presented the School Excellence Award in 2007 and 2011, making it one of eight schools to receive the honour.

Culture

Crest 
Scientist and artist Leonardo da Vinci is featured on the school crest depicting an 'all-round' education. The bird and the flying machine on the crest represent a desire to go beyond the realms of ordinary education.

Houses 
The five houses, named after Albert Einstein, Leonardo da Vinci, Aristotle, Rabindranath Tagore, and Ernest Rutherford, are represented by the colours red, purple, blue and yellow respectively.

Year 1 students are sorted into houses by class. The results from inter-house sports and academic competitions are summed up in a yearly points system. House allocations used to be student-based, instead of class-based. However, since 2020, there are no longer houses in TK.

Uniform

Boys wear white short-sleeved shirts with a school badge on the breast pocket. Lower Secondary boys wear white short trousers. Upper Secondary boys wear long white trousers. Girls wear a short-sleeved blouse with the school badge on the left. The skirt is jade-green with box pleats. A green and yellow striped tie is worn on some occasions.

School Building

A possible reason behind the incorporation of an octagonal structure in the school's building can be related to Leonardo da Vinci's obsession on octagons and the school's association with him.

Student life

Leadership Development Opportunities 

A select 15 PHL students will form the panel of the CCM Grant, a programme by the National Youth Council. As the CCM Panelists, they will be assessing community service project grant applications supported by their peers. Year 4 PHL students will attend an annual mass training on Effective Communication and Presentation Skills.

Tanjong Katong Band
The TK Band has its roots in the school bands of the former Tanjong Katong Technical School and Tanjong Katong Girls' School. The bands started separately in 1965 with only 26 members. In 1967, the two bands came together for a combined performance that marked their long relationship. The band split again in 1989, with TKGS going its own way. Since established, it has represented the republic in several overseas events and International Bands' festivals. In 1998, the band was invited to put up a solo performance in the National Day Parade (NDP), the first ever for any school band. It also appeared on National Day Parades 2002, 2004 (during the pre-parade segments in both years), NDP 2012, Chingay Parades, etc., in solo performances. In 2014, TK Band was invited to play at the Taoyuan Band Festival in Taiwan (Republic of China). TK Band was also invited to play at the Singapore Youth Festival Opening Ceremony 2014 held at Gardens by the Bay.
After 2 years of no school performers TK Band was invited to perform at NDP 2022 as an opening act titled "GO LIVE"

Other
The school also has a computer club and a girls Tanjong Katong Floorball team, and a choir that in 2011, as part of the annual Jubilate Festival of Choirs, participated in a choral exam by the London College of Music. In 2014, TK Choir took part in Asia Cantate in Hong Kong. In 2014, Tanjong Katong Secondary School announced the shutdown of Tanjong Katong Red Cross Youth (TKRCY), one of its six uniform groups. Recently, Tanjong Katong Secondary School's National Police Cadet Corps achieved Gold in Unit Proficiency thanks to the batches of Sec 1, Sec 2, Sec 3 and 4 of 2019.

Notable alumni

Academia
 Chua Beng Huat – Singaporean sociologist

Entertainment
 Jack Neo – Singaporean film director
 Kym Ng – Singaporean actress 
 Haresh Sharma – Singaporean playwright
 Bryan Wong – Singaporean actor
 Race Wong – Singaporean singer, 2R 
 Rosanne Wong – Singaporean singer, 2R

Politics
 Lawrence Wong – Deputy Prime Minister of Singapore and Minister for Finance
 Yaacob Ibrahim – Singaporean politician
 Kishore Mahbubani – Singaporean diplomat
 Nicole Seah – Singaporean politician 
 David Ong – Singaporean politician

Sports
 Lim Tong Hai – Singaporean professional footballer

External links
School website
TK Band Website

References 

 Chia, S., Huang, G., Tan, S., Wong, P., & Wong, S. (n.d.). Tangs Plaza and Marriot Hotel. Retrieved from http://www.math.nus.edu.sg/aslaksen/gem-projects/maa/Landscapes_of_Mathematical_Interest_in_Singapore/main.html
 Cornelius, V. (n.d.). Tanjong Katong. Retrieved from http://eresources.nlb.gov.sg/infopedia/articles/SIP_829_2005-01-18.html
 Dunman High School. (2016). Chapter 01: Born in the Troubled Fifties: 14 Oct 1956. Retrieved from 
 Katong Homes. (n.d.). Dunman High School. Retrieved from https://katonghomes.com/living-in-katong/education-schools-in-katong/dunman-high-school/
 Lai. (1995). Meanings of Multiethnicity.
 Loo, L., Shi, M., & Sun, S. (2003). Public housing and ethnic integration in Singapore. Habitat International, 27, 293–307.
 National Library Board. (2014). Ethnic Integration Policy is Implemented. Retrieved from http://eresources.nlb.gov.sg/history/events/d8fea656-d86e-4658-9509-974225951607
 One Historical Map. (2016). Katong Student Hostel. Retrieved from https://ohm.onemap.sg/#/index/main
 Quah, I. (2007, January 27). The Communists in Singapore and Malaya. Retrieved from https://www.slideshare.net/mrsirvinglong/the-communists-in-singapore-and-malaya1
 Singapore Tourism Board. (2017). Lau Pa Sat. Retrieved from http://www.yoursingapore.com/see-do-singapore/architecture/historical/lau-pa-sat.html
 Tang, K. (2012, January 3). Political History in Singapore 1985-2005 [Interview by C. Yeo]. Retrieved from http://www.nas.gov.sg/archivesonline/viewer?uuid=bf3502fe-1160-11e3-83d5-0050568939ad-OHC002936_001
 Tanjong Katong Secondary School. (2014). Our Rich Heritage. Retrieved from 
 Tanjong Katong Secondary School. (2014). Tanjong Katong Secondary School Heritage Lab.
 Wong, L. (2014, October 11). More ways to learn about Singapore's heritage. Retrieved from 

Autonomous schools in Singapore
Secondary schools in Singapore
Educational institutions established in 1956
1956 establishments in Malaya